Bablon Island is the ice-free island off the west coast of Barison Peninsula, Graham Coast on the Antarctic Peninsula extending 1.15 km in southeast-northwest direction and 400 m wide.  It is lying on the west side of Macrobius Cove and separated from Eijkman Point to the south by a 220 m wide passage.

The feature is named after the settlement of Bablon in Southern Bulgaria.

Location

British mapping in 1971.

Maps
 British Antarctic Territory.  Scale 1:200000 topographic map. DOS 610 Series, Sheet W 65 64.  Directorate of Overseas Surveys, Tolworth, UK, 1971.
 Antarctic Digital Database (ADD). Scale 1:250000 topographic map of Antarctica. Scientific Committee on Antarctic Research (SCAR). Since 1993, regularly upgraded and updated.

References

 Bablon Island. SCAR Composite Antarctic Gazetteer.
 Bulgarian Antarctic Gazetteer. Antarctic Place-names Commission. (details in Bulgarian, basic data in English)

External links
 Bablon Island. Copernix satellite image

Bulgaria and the Antarctic
Islands of Graham Land
Graham Coast